Khalid Issa Al-Hamadi (born October 27, 1987 in Doha) is a Qatari foil fencer. Al-Hamadi made an official debut for his sporting discipline at the 2008 Summer Olympics in Beijing, where he competed in the individual foil event. He lost the first preliminary match to South Korea's Choi Byung-Chul, with a score of 3–15.

References

1982 births
Living people
Qatari male foil fencers
Olympic fencers of Qatar
Fencers at the 2008 Summer Olympics
People from Doha
Fencers at the 2006 Asian Games
Asian Games competitors for Qatar